Richard Anthony Drago (born June 25, 1945) is a former American League relief pitcher in Major League Baseball who played for the Kansas City Royals (-), Boston Red Sox (-, -), California Angels (-), Baltimore Orioles (1977) and Seattle Mariners. He batted and threw right-handed.
 
In a 13-season career, Drago posted a 108–117 record with a 3.75 ERA and 58 saves in 519 appearances (189 as a starter).

Drago played high school ball for Woodward High School in Toledo, Ohio, graduating in 1963. He was originally signed by the Detroit Tigers in the  amateur draft, but was selected by the Kansas City Royals during the  expansion draft. He was traded by the Royals to the Red Sox for Marty Pattin on October 24, 1973,
 
Drago also pitched for the Angels and Orioles in part of two seasons. He had been acquired by the Orioles from the Angels for Dyar Miller on June 13, 1977. He filed for free agency after his lone season with the Orioles. He returned to Boston after signing with the Red Sox on November 21, 1977. During his last three years with the Red Sox, he saved 13 games with a 10–6 record in 1979. He ended his major league career with Seattle in 1981.

On July 20, 1976, Drago gave up the last of Hank Aaron's then-major league record 755 career home runs.

References

External links

Dick Drago - Baseballbiography.com
The 50 Greatest Royals of All-Time- #35 Dick Drago

1945 births
Living people
Major League Baseball pitchers
Baseball players from Ohio
Kansas City Royals players
Boston Red Sox players
California Angels players
Baltimore Orioles players
Seattle Mariners players
Sportspeople from Toledo, Ohio
Detroit Mercy Titans baseball players
Rocky Mount Leafs players
Daytona Beach Islanders players
Montgomery Rebels players
Toledo Mud Hens players
Fort Myers Sun Sox players